A by-election was held for the New South Wales Legislative Assembly electorate of Central Cumberland on 28 June 1875 because of the resignation of Joseph Wearne.

Dates

Result

Joseph Wearne rsigned.

See also
Electoral results for the district of Central Cumberland
List of New South Wales state by-elections

References

1875 elections in Australia
New South Wales state by-elections
1870s in New South Wales